Harris Savides (Greek: Χάρης Σαββίδης; September 28, 1957 – October 9, 2012) was an American cinematographer. Notable films include Gus Van Sant's "young death" trilogy (Gerry, Elephant, and Last Days), and the Van Sant films Milk, Finding Forrester, and Restless; David Fincher's The Game, Zodiac, and the opening title sequence in Seven; Martin Scorsese's short film The Key to Reserva; Wong Kar Wai's short film The Follow; Ridley Scott's American Gangster; Woody Allen's Whatever Works; Sofia Coppola's Somewhere and The Bling Ring; Noah Baumbach's Greenberg and Margot at the Wedding; and John Turturro's Illuminata.

Savides also won a "Best Cinematographer" New York Film Critics Circle award in 2003 for his cinematography work in Gerry and Elephant. Savides was also nominated five times for Best Cinematographer in the Independent Spirit Awards for his cinematography in Gerry, Elephant, Last Days, Milk and Greenberg. In 2007, Savides was nominated for a Satellite Award for Best Cinematography for Zodiac. In 2008, Savides was nominated for a BAFTA award for Best Cinematographer in American Gangster. In 2011, Savides was nominated for a Best Cinematography National Society of Film Critics Award for his cinematography work in Somewhere.

Music videos and short films

Savides has also been the cinematographer on a number of well-known music videos directed by Mark Romanek including Michael Jackson's Scream, Madonna's Rain and Bedtime Story, Fiona Apple's Criminal, and Nine Inch Nails' Closer. He has also served as cinematographer on the music videos for The Rolling Stones' "Like A Rolling Stone" (directed by Michel Gondry), Chris Isaak's Blue Spanish Sky (directed by Bruce Weber) and R.E.M.'s Everybody Hurts (directed by Jake Scott, son of Ridley Scott). Savides is the only person to date that has won three MTV Video Music Awards for Best Cinematography in a Music Video (for Madonna's "Rain", Fiona Apple's "Criminal" and R.E.M.'s "Everybody Hurts") and the only person to win two in a row (for "Rain" by Madonna and "Everybody Hurts" by R.E.M.) Savides also was the cinematographer for the Tom Waits music video, "Goin' Out West" (directed by Jesse Dylan).

Savides also was the director of photography on a short film directed by Wong Kar Wai for BMW's "The Hire" film series entitled The Follow. The film starred Clive Owen, Mickey Rourke and Adriana Lima. Savides was also the director of photography on a short film directed by Martin Scorsese as a homage to Alfred Hitchcock (and also sponsored by Freixenet Cava champagne) entitled The Key to Reserva.

Savides has also collaborated as a director of photography with director John Hillcoat (Lawless, The Proposition, The Road) in a series of Levi's commercials for their "To Work" advertising campaign.

Feature films

Savides first solo job as a cinematographer was on the thriller starring Alec Baldwin, Heaven's Prisoners (1996) directed by Phil Joanou. Before that film, he served as a cinematographer on a TV short film entitled The Investigator (1994) directed by Matthew Tabak and a TV movie Lake Consequence (1993) directed by Rafael Eisenman. One of his earliest jobs was being the director of photography on a workout video from Cindy Crawford.

Savides was the cinematographer for a total of six films directed by Gus Van Sant: Gerry, Elephant, Last Days, Milk, Finding Forrester, and Restless. Savides also shot two films for David Fincher: The Game and the mostly digital Zodiac, and the footage that was used in the opening title sequence of Fincher's Seven. With Noah Baumbach Savides was director of photography on Greenberg and Margot at the Wedding, and under Martin Scorsese, the short film The Key to Reserva and with Wong Kar Wai, "The Follow," another short film. He was also the director of photography for Ridley Scott's American Gangster and Woody Allen's Whatever Works. He was additionally the director of photography on a film directed by John Turturro, Illuminata.

Savides was also the cinematographer on two films directed by Sofia Coppola, The Bling Ring and Somewhere, a departure from Coppola's regular DP Lance Acord. For the visual style of Somewhere, she discussed Bruce Weber's Hollywood portraits and Helmut Newton's of models at the Chateau Marmont, and Jeanne Dielman, 23 quai du Commerce, 1080 Bruxelles (1975), the film by Chantal Akerman about the routine of a Belgian housewife, with Savides. Savides said, "The main thing was to tell the story really simply and let it play out in long beats and have the audience discover the moment." Coppola used the lenses that her father had filmed Rumble Fish (1983) with in an effort to give the film a more period look, although it is set in the present. The Bling Ring was Savides' last film.

Besides his frequent collaborations with Gus Van Sant, David Fincher, Noah Baumbach and Sofia Coppola, Savides was known for the very delicate images that he created for The Yards (directed by James Gray) and Birth (directed by Jonathan Glazer). In both instances he underexposed the filmstock by several stops in order to break up the colors and give the blacks a purplish and brownish tint. This non-conventional approach lead to a look that resembles the paintings of Georges de La Tour and Caravaggio.

Personal life

Savides was born in New York City, New York, to parents of Greek Cypriot origin, Eleni, a clerical worker, and Savas Savides, a short-order cook. He graduated with a degree in photography and film from the School of Visual Arts in New York City.

Savides lived in Manhattan with his wife Medine, and daughter Sophie. He died from brain cancer, at age 55.

Filmography

References

External links

Museum of the Moving Image interview

1957 births
2012 deaths
American cinematographers
American people of Greek Cypriot descent
Deaths from cancer in New York (state)
Deaths from brain cancer in the United States
People from Manhattan